Rohanixalus vittatus is a species of frog in the family Rhacophoridae. It is found in Northeast India, Bangladesh, Myanmar, Thailand, Cambodia, Laos, and Vietnam, as well as in isolated populations in southern China (in southeastern Tibet, southern Yunnan and Guangxi, Hainan, Guangdong, and Zhejiang). Many common names have been coined for it: two-striped pigmy tree frog, Bhamo tree frog, Boulenger's tree frog, striped Asian treefrog, violet pigmy tree frog, and lateral-striped opposite-fingered treefrog.

Formerly described in Feihyla, it was moved to the new genus Rohanixalus in 2020 following a phylogenetic study.

It tolerates some habitat modification and also occurs in rice paddies. It is a widespread and generally common species that is not facing known threats. Its range includes a number of protected areas.

References

vittatus
Amphibians of Bangladesh
Amphibians of Cambodia
Frogs of China
Frogs of India
Amphibians of Laos
Amphibians of Myanmar
Amphibians of Thailand
Amphibians of Vietnam
Amphibians described in 1887
Taxa named by George Albert Boulenger
Taxonomy articles created by Polbot